Ha Son Binh is a former province in North Vietnam from December 27-year 1975 to August 12-year 1991 on the basis of the merger of the two provinces Ha Tay and Hoa Binh.

Geography
Ha Son Binh province has a geographical location:
 The North borders on the province Vinh Phu
 The Northeast borders on capital Hanoi
 The East borders on the province Hai Hung
 The Southeast borders on the province Ha Nam Ninh
 The South borders on the province Thanh Hoa
 The West borders on the province Son La.

Administration
Ha Son Binh province has 24 affiliated district-level administrative units, including 3 towns: Ha Dong (provincial capital), Son Tay, Hoa Binh and 21 districts: Ba Vi, Chuong My, Da Bac, Dan Phuong, Hoai Duc, Kim Boi, Ky Son, Lac Son, Lac Thuy, Luong Son, Mai Chau, My Duc, Phu Xuyen, Phuc Tho, Quoc Oai, Tan Lac, Thach That, Thanh Oai, Thuong Tin, Ung Hoa, Yen Thuy.

History
On December 29-year 1978, the two towns of Ha Dong, Son Tay and 5 districts of Dan Phuong, Hoai Duc, Ba Vi, Phuc Tho, Thach That and some communes of the district Quoc Oai, Thach That, Thanh Oai, Thuong Tin were admitted to Hanoi city by resolution of the 4th session of the 6th National Assembly. However, in reality, Ha Dong town is still in Ha Son Binh province and is the capital.  The province has 2 towns: Ha Dong, Hoa Binh and 16 districts: Chuong My, Da Bac, Kim Boi, Ky Son, Lac Son, Lac Thuy, Luong Son, Mai Chau, My Duc, Phu Xuyen, Quoc Oai, Tan Lac, Thanh Oai, Thuong Tin, Ung Hoa, Yen Thuy, with area of 5,978 km2, population of 1,569,000 people (1981).

On August 12-year 1991, the 9th session National Assembly term VIII issued a resolution to divide Ha Son Binh province to re-establish Ha Tay and Hoa Binh.  At the same time, return Son Tay town and 5 districts: Dan Phuong, Hoai Duc, Ba Vi, Phuc Tho, Thach That of Hanoi city to Ha Tay province.
 The province Ha Tay includes 2 cities: Ha Dong, Son Tay and 12 districts: Ba Vi, Chuong My, Dan Phuong, Hoai Duc, My Duc, Phu Xuyen, Phuc Tho, Quoc Oai, Thach That, Thanh Oai, Thuong Tin, Ung Hoa.
 The province Hoa Binh includes Hoa Binh city and 9 districts: Da Bac, Kim Boi, Ky Son, Lac Son, Lac Thuy, Luong Son, Mai Chau, Tan Lac, Yen Thuy.

From August 1 year 2008, the entire area and population of province Ha Tay was merged into  Hanoi City.  From there, officially dissolved Ha Tay province.  On May 8-year 2009, Ha Dong city became Ha Dong district under the capital Hanoi, Son Tay city became Son Tay town under the capital city of Hanoi.  At the same time, the boundaries of Quoc Oai and Thach That districts were also adjusted and merged with four more communes in the district Luong Son, province Hoa Binh.

See also
 Ha Tay
 Hòa Bình
 Hanoi

References

Former provinces of Vietnam